Coyuya is a station on the Mexico City Metro.

General information
Coyuya is on Line 8, between Metro Santa Anita and Metro Iztacalco. It is located in the Iztacalco borough, in the eastern portion of the Mexican Federal District, and serves the Colonia Tlazintla district and neighbourhoods surrounding Avenida Coyuya, Avenida Francisco del Paso y Troncoso (eje 3-Ote), and Avenida Plutarco Elías Calles (eje 4-Sur).
A surface station, it was first opened to public passenger traffic on 20 July 1994.

Ridership

Name and iconography
The station logo depicts the ankle of an Aztec dancer festooned with a cuff-rattle made from nutshells – a pre-Hispanic musical instrument known by the Spanish name cascabel (similar to jingle bells). "Coyuya" is a Nahuatl toponym that means "place where cascabeles are made".

References

External links 
 

Coyuya
Railway stations opened in 1994
1994 establishments in Mexico
Mexico City Metro stations in Iztacalco
Accessible Mexico City Metro stations